The Big Cigar is an upcoming biographical drama thriller miniseries developed by Jim Hecht and Joshuah Bearman.

Premise
Chronicles the manhunt for Huey P. Newton, the founder of the Black Panther Party, who seeks the help of film producer Bert Schneider as he tries to escape to Cuba.

Cast

Main
 André Holland as Huey P. Newton
 Tiffany Boone as Gwen Fontaine
 Alessandro Nivola as Bert Schneider
 Marc Menchaca as Sydney Clark
 P. J. Byrne as Stephen Blauner

Recurring
 Jordane Christie as Bobby Seale
 Moses Ingram as Teressa Dixon
 Olli Haaskivi as Arthur A. Ross
 Glynn Turman as Walter Newton
 Jaime Ray Newman as Roz Torrance
 Noah Emmerich as Stanley Schneider
 John Doman as Abe Schneider
 Chris Brochu as Dennis Hopper
 Brenton Allen as Eldridge Cleaver

Guest
 Al McFoster as Ceddy
 Taylor Jackson as Candice Bergen
 Inny Clemons as Richard Pryor
 Liz Adjei as Betty Shabazz
 Brian Jansen as Warren Winkle

Episodes
The first episode was written by Jim Hecht, with the third through sixth written by Laurence Andries & Gwendolyn M. Parker, Janine Sherman Barrois & Hecht, Andries & Valerie Woods & Ameer Hasan, and Hecht & Joshuah Bearman.

Production
It was announced in December 2012 that Jonathan Dayton and Valerie Faris were set to direct the project for Sony Pictures, at the time developed as a film, with Joshuah Bearman, author of the source article, and Jim Hecht set to write the screenplay.

The project, now a miniseries, was given a greenlight from Apple TV+ in April 2022, with André Holland cast to star. Don Cheadle was announced to be directing the first two episodes in addition to executive producing. In June, Tiffany Boone and Alessandro Nivola joined the cast, with Marc Menchaca and P. J. Byrne joining the next month. In August, Jordane Christie, Moses Ingram, Olli Haaskivi and Glynn Turman were cast to recur in the series. Additional recurring cast including Jaime Ray Newman and Noah Emmerich was announced in September.

Filming for the series began in Toronto in June 2022, as revealed by showrunner Janine Sherman Barrois. By August, production was occurring throughout Hamilton, Ontario, where Hamilton City Hall was being used as a double for San Francisco International Airport.

References

External links
The Big Cigar at the Internet Movie Database

Apple TV+ original programming
Biographical television series
Upcoming television series
Television shows filmed in Toronto
Television series by Warner Bros. Television Studios
Works based on periodical articles
Works about the Black Panther Party